In mathematics, two sets are said to be disjoint sets if they have no element in common. Equivalently, two disjoint sets are sets whose intersection is the empty set. For example, {1, 2, 3} and {4, 5, 6} are disjoint sets, while {1, 2, 3} and {3, 4, 5} are not disjoint. A collection of two or more sets is called disjoint if any two distinct sets of the collection are disjoint.

Generalizations

This definition of disjoint sets can be extended to a family of sets : the family is pairwise disjoint, or mutually disjoint if  whenever . Alternatively, some authors use the term disjoint to refer to this notion as well. 

For families the notion of pairwise disjoint or mutually disjoint is sometimes defined in a subtly different manner, in that repeated identical members are allowed: the family is pairwise disjoint if  whenever  (every two distinct sets in the family are disjoint). For example, the collection of sets  is disjoint, as is the set  of the two parity classes of integers; the family  with 10 members is not disjoint (because the classes of even and odd numbers are each present five times), but it is pairwise disjoint according to this definition (since one only gets a non-empty intersection of two members when the two are the same class).

Two sets are said to be almost disjoint sets if their intersection is small in some sense. For instance, two infinite sets whose intersection is a finite set may be said to be almost disjoint.

In topology, there are various notions of separated sets with more strict conditions than disjointness. For instance, two sets may be considered to be separated when they have disjoint closures or disjoint neighborhoods. Similarly, in a metric space, positively separated sets are sets separated by a nonzero distance.

Intersections
Disjointness of two sets, or of a family of sets, may be expressed in terms of intersections of pairs of them.

Two sets A and B are disjoint if and only if their intersection  is the empty set.
It follows from this definition that every set is disjoint from the empty set,
and that the empty set is the only set that is disjoint from itself.

If a collection contains at least two sets, the condition that the collection is disjoint implies that the intersection of the whole collection is empty. However,  a collection of sets may have an empty intersection without being disjoint. Additionally, while a collection of less than two sets is trivially disjoint, as there are no pairs to compare, the intersection of a collection of one set is equal to that set, which may be non-empty. For instance, the three sets  have an empty intersection but are not disjoint. In fact, there are no two disjoint sets in this collection. Also the empty family of sets is pairwise disjoint.

A Helly family is a system of sets within which the only subfamilies with empty intersections are the ones that are pairwise disjoint. For instance, the closed intervals of the real numbers form a Helly family: if a family of closed intervals has an empty intersection and is minimal (i.e. no subfamily of the family has an empty intersection), it must be pairwise disjoint.

Disjoint unions and partitions
A partition of a set X is any collection of mutually disjoint non-empty sets whose union is X. Every partition can equivalently be described by an equivalence relation, a binary relation that describes whether two elements belong to the same set in the partition.
Disjoint-set data structures and partition refinement are two techniques in computer science for efficiently maintaining partitions of a set subject to, respectively, union operations that merge two sets or refinement operations that split one set into two.

A disjoint union may mean one of two things. Most simply, it may mean the union of sets that are disjoint. But if two or more sets are not already disjoint, their disjoint union may be formed by modifying the sets to make them disjoint before forming the union of the modified sets. For instance two sets may be made disjoint by replacing each element by an ordered pair of the element and a binary value indicating whether it belongs to the first or second set.
For families of more than two sets, one may similarly replace each element by an ordered pair of the element and the index of the set that contains it.

See also
Hyperplane separation theorem for disjoint convex sets
Mutually exclusive events
Relatively prime, numbers with disjoint sets of prime divisors
Separoid
Set packing, the problem of finding the largest disjoint subfamily of a family of sets

References

External links

Basic concepts in set theory
Families of sets